Peter Conover Hains III (May 11, 1901 – July 3, 1998) was an American Army cavalry officer and major general who competed in the 1928 Olympic games in the modern pentathlon.  Hains graduated from West Point in 1924, where he ranked 162nd in his class.  Hains' family had a long legacy of military service, with his great grandfather, grandfather, and uncle all serving as high-ranking military officers.  Hains' father Peter Hains was involved in an infamous murder scandal in New York City in 1909.

General Hains served as commander of the First Armored Regiment in North Africa during the war. He was also armored adviser for the European invasion and then was assigned to the Pacific to help plan an invasion of Japan.

After the war, he was assigned to Washington as deputy director of the office of the secretary of defense. General Hains was later deputy commanding general of the Second Army, chief of the military assistance advisory group in Yugoslavia, chief of staff of the Fourth Army and chief of the military advisory group in Thailand.

His honors included a Silver Star, a Distinguished Service Medal, three Legions of Merit, two Bronze Star Medals, a Purple Heart and an Army Commendation Medal.

He died at Fort Belvoir, Virginia on July 3, 1998, and was buried at Arlington National Cemetery.

See also
 Peter Conover Hains
 Peter Hains

References

1901 births
1998 deaths
People from Winthrop, Massachusetts
United States Military Academy alumni
United States Army generals
Burials at Arlington National Cemetery
Modern pentathletes at the 1928 Summer Olympics
Olympic modern pentathletes of the United States
American male modern pentathletes
Sportspeople from Suffolk County, Massachusetts
Recipients of the Distinguished Service Medal (US Army)
United States Army personnel of World War II
United States Army personnel of the Korean War
Military personnel from Massachusetts